The year 1938 was marked, in science fiction, by the following events.

Births and deaths

Births 
 Hans-Jürgen Dittfeld
 Peter Griese (d. 1996)
 Paul van Herck (d. 1989)
 Michael Kurland
 Justin Leiber (d. 2016)
 Larry Niven.  His best-known work is Ringworld (1970)
 William Voltz (d. 1984)
 Ted White
 M. K. Wren (d. 2016)
 Janusz A. Zajdel (d. 1985)

Deaths 
 Curt Abel-Musgrave (b. 1860)
 Karel Čapek (b. 1890) 
 Frigyes Karinthy (b. 1887)
 Karl August von Laffert (b. 1872)
 Max Osterberg (b. 1865)
 Emil Sandt (b. 1864)

Events 
 October 30 - The War of the Worlds, radio drama directed and narrated by actor and future filmmaker Orson Welles as an adaptation of H. G. Wells's novel The War of the Worlds (1898). The episode became famous for allegedly causing panic among its listening audience, though the scale of that panic is disputed, as the program had relatively few listeners.

Literary releases

Novels 
 For Us, The Living: A Comedy of Customs by Robert A. Heinlein
 Galactic Patrol by E. E. Smith
 Out of the Silent Planet by C. S. Lewis

Short stories 
 "Azathoth" by H. P. Lovecraft
 "The Command" by L. Sprague de Camp
 "Helen O'Loy" by Lester del Rey
 "Hollerbochen's Dilemma" by Ray Bradbury
 "How We Went to Mars" by Arthur C. Clarke 
 "Hyperpilosity" by L. Sprague de Camp
 "The Men and the Mirror" by Ross Rocklynne
 "The Merman" by L. Sprague de Camp
 "Rule 18" by Clifford D. Simak
 "Tidal Moon" by Stanley G. Weinbaum and Helen Weinbaum
 Who Goes There?,  novella by John W. Campbell, Jr.

Movies

Awards 
The main science-fiction Awards known at the present time did not exist at this time.

See also 
 1938 in science
 1937 in science fiction

References

Sources
 
 

Science fiction by year

science-fiction